The 2007 Continental Cup of Curling was held at the Medicine Hat Arena in Medicine Hat, Alberta on December 13-16. North America won its third title, defeating Team Europe 290-110.

Format
The Continental Cup involves four disciplines within the sport, each worth a designated number of points - Team Games (72 points), Mixed Doubles (36 points), Singles (32 points) and Skins Games (260 points).   The first side to score 201 points is declared the winner. Each member of the winning side receives $2,000, while the losing side members get $1,400 each from the $88,400 total purse.

The revised Mixed Doubles format involved only two players per team, instead of the previous four (two throwers and two sweepers), who also become sweepers during the eight-end games.   Each team throws five rocks per end, with two stationary stones placed before each end, one in the house and one in front.

Teams

Broadcast
The final women's and men's skins games were broadcast on CBC.

Results

Mixed doubles

Round 1
December 13, 9:30

Round 2
December 15, 16:00

Women's team

Round 1
December 13, 14:00

Round 2
December 14, 9:30

Men's team

Round 1
December 13, 18:30

Round 2
December 14, 18:30

Singles
December 14, 14:00

No data available for other match-ups

Points: Europe 4–28 North America after bonus of 8 points to North America

Skins

"A" Competition
December 15, 11:30
Mixed

Women

Men

"B" Competition
December 15, 19:30

"C" Competition
Women
December 16, 10:30

Men
December 16, 11:30

Sources
Official Site
Results from Curling Russia

Curling
Continental Cup of Curling
Sport in Medicine Hat
2007 in Canadian curling
2007 in Alberta
Curling competitions in Alberta